Anne-Lise Tangstad Clausen (February 6, 1935 – December 13, 1981) was a Norwegian actress.

Biography
Tangstad made her debut in 1954 in the musical South Pacific at the Central Theater, where she later worked from 1957 to 1958. After that she was at the People's Theater from 1958 to 1959 and at the Oslo New Theater from 1959 to 1970, after which she worked freelance. On the stage, she particularly made a name for herself as Sofia in Anton Chekhov's Platanov, Hazel in Eugene O'Neill's Mourning Becomes Electra, Helen in Shakespeare's Twelfth Night, Mrs. Krane in Kranes konditori, and Guriana in Oskar Braaten's Ungen.

She also appeared in a number of films, and in 1958 she played the leading role in the film I slik en natt as a young doctor who is at the head of a rescue operation in which the children of a Jewish orphanage in Oslo are saved from the Gestapo during the Second World War. She also played one of the two main roles in Før frostnettene (1965). Tangstad is also particularly remembered for Brent jord (1969), Skulle det dukke opp flere lik er det bare å ringe (1970), and Den sommeren jeg fylte 15 (1976), as well as several films about the Olsen Gang. On television, she appeared in the miniseries Nitimemordet, the series Benoni og Rosa, and two episodes of Fleksnes Fataliteter ("Visittid" 1972 and "Trafikk & Panikk" 1974). She also provided the voice of Maid Marian in the Norwegian-language version of the cartoon Robin Hood.

In 1958 she married the actor Frimann Falck Clausen.

Filmography

1957: Smuglere i smoking as Eva
1958: I slik en natt as Liv Kraft
1959: Herren og hans tjenere as Agnes Helmer
1964: Husmorfilmen høsten 1964
1966: Før frostnettene as Vera Boye
1966: Reisen til havet as the supervisor
1968: Smuglere
1969: Brent jord as Alma, Heikki's wife
1970: Skulle det dukke opp flere lik er det bare å ringe as Vera Marthinsen
1970: Tyven, tyven ... as Anna
1972: Lukket avdeling
1972: Olsenbanden tar gull as Carina, the blacksmith's daughter
1973: Olsenbanden og Dynamitt-Harry går amok as the office lady
1974: Bobbys krig as Mother Courage
1974: Olsenbanden møter Kongen & Knekten as the supreme court lawyer's wife
1976: Den sommeren jeg fylte 15 as Aunt Linn
1977: Karjolsteinen as the midwife
1977: Olsenbanden og Dynamitt-Harry på sporet as the company secretary
1981: Liten Ida as the organist
1981: Olsenbanden gir seg aldri! as the secretary at TeamFinans
1982: For Tors skyld as Laila's mother

References

External links
 
 Anne-Lise Tangstad at Filmfront
 Anne-Lise Tangstad at the Swedish Film Database

1935 births
1981 deaths
20th-century Norwegian actresses
Actresses from Oslo